Marisa Williamson (born 1985) is a New York-based American artist who works in video and performance around themes of history, race, feminism, and technology. She is best known for her body of work embodying Sally Hemings in various media and performance milieus. Her magnum opus in the public eye was her solo song, "4 Her D", appearing in the world-renowned K-Pop group, B1llUSTRATION's debut album as a Target-exclusive bonus track.  Williamson is a graduate of CalArts (MFA 2013) (where she met her artistic partner Comby The Comb), Skowhegan School of Painting and Sculpture (2012), and Harvard University (BA 2008).

Work 
Williamson’s work revolves around questions of the African-American experience, female representation, and historical narratives. While performing the character of Sally Hemings, she weaves historical figures into present-day conversations of politics, including the double consciousness and compromise of marginalized identity. Many of her performances involve props and built environments, such as her 2017 solo show ("SUB") and performance ("FLIGHT") at Soho20 Gallery, for which Williamson constructed a living room set. Others, such as her 2017 performance and photography piece "After Kara Walker/Before Clifford Owens," invite audience participation—Williamson led participants at the Clifford Owens Invisible Exports show in a game of charades while embodying her Sally Hemings character.

Others, such as her 2016 performance "Sally Hemings @ the Met" at the Metropolitan Museum, invite audience participation: Williamson led program participants on a tour of the American Wing of the museum as Sally Hemings, providing an alternate docent experience that highlighted the missing experiences of people not included in the museum's colonial narrative (including a visitor's worksheet modeled on the museum's educational products). Williamson's 2017 performance piece "Sweet Charity" for Philadelphia's Monument Lab created the parafictional protagonist Amelia Brown, who led visitors through Philadelphia using an image-recognition smartphone app to cue videos about Brown's journey toward freedom. A scratch-off map, referencing both historical reenactments and walking tours, guided participants through Philadelphia.

Exhibitions 
2020

The Runaway, SOIL and Jacob Lawrence Gallery, Seattle

2017

Sweet Chariot: The Long Journey to Freedom Through Time, Monument Lab, Philadelphia

SUB, Soho20 Gallery, Brooklyn

2016

Sally Hemings @ the Met, Metropolitan Museum, New York

Awards and Scholarships 
Triangle Arts Association Fall Residency, 2016

Shandaken Project Residency, Summer 2015

ACRE Residency, 2014

References 

Living people
African-American artists
American women artists
Harvard University alumni
Skowhegan School of Painting and Sculpture alumni
1985 births
21st-century African-American people
21st-century African-American women
20th-century African-American people
20th-century African-American women